David Cleland Clark (21 May 1878–unknown) was an Irish footballer who played in the Football League for Bradford Park Avenue and Glossop and in the Southern League for Bristol Rovers, Northampton Town, Southend United and West Ham United.

References

1878 births
English footballers
Association football goalkeepers
English Football League players
Northampton Town F.C. players
Glossop North End A.F.C. players
Bristol Rovers F.C. players
West Ham United F.C. players
Bradford (Park Avenue) A.F.C. players
Southend United F.C. players
Year of death missing